DigitAlb Sh.A is an Albanian media, digital satellite and terrestrial TV platform based in Tirana, Albania. The TV platform began terrestrial broadcasts in July 2004, and satellite broadcasts by the end of that year. At the same time, DigitAlb began broadcasting some channels of defunct AlbaniaSat's satellite platform SAT + which eventually went bankrupt. DigitAlb closely collaborates with absorbing sports package SuperSport while having introduced wireless DVB-H technology for wireless TV for the first time in Albania since 2006. On July 15th 2022, to celebrate 18 years, Digitalb launched its OTT service. 

The company forms part of Top Media Group together with Top Channel, Top Albania Radio, Top Gold Radio, daily newspaper Shqip, Shqip Magazine, coffee producer Lori Caffe, Top News, VGA Studio, My Music Radio, and musicAL. In Europe, Digitalb will broadcast until 2026 on Eutelsat.

Channels
Digitalb's channels include Top Channel, Top News, T, Film Aksion, Film Komedi, Film Hits, Gold, Max, Family, Film Dramë, Stinët, Explorer Shkencë, Explorer Natyrë, Explorer Histori, Eurofilm, Film Thriller, Film Autor, SuperSport, Bang Bang, Çufo, and Junior.

New developments
On 14 February 2013, DigitAlb launched a new model of set-top box, and also new services. Launching a middleware set-top box, DigitAlb started interactive services for its customers. So push VOD, online betting, lotteries, games, IPTV, web navigation through the set-top box and many other options became available to customers. This was the most important new development since the launch of the HD service back in 2007.

Decoders
 SD decoders are: Opentech ODS 3000C, Opentech ODS 2000C (old SD decoder).
 HD decoders are: Kaon KSF-S660HDCO, Opentech ODS 3000H, ODS 2000H(old HD decoder).
 Digitalb terrestrial standard definition decoders are: Opentech ODT 1000C and Kaon KTF-270CO(old terrestrial SD decoder).
 Digitalb terrestrial high definition (T2) decoder is: ODT 2000H(premium HD terriestrial decoder).
 Digitalb satellite HD Middleware decoder is: ODS 4000H(the HD middleware satellite decoder).
 Digitalb the newest decoder with PVR, Internet, online apps and other things is called Flybox. It started selling in March 2013, and it is an Albanian product made by DigitAlb companies in Albania(new decoder).
 FlyBox mini(mini new Flybox decoder)
 Hard Disk i DigitAlb (HDD)(high-definition-definition hard disk)

All DigitAlb decoders are Conax Conditional access Embedded.

References

External links
Official website
Official website SuperSport
Official website for DigitAlb Swiss
Channel and transponder list
Owners website

Direct broadcast satellite services
Mass media companies of Albania
Albanian brands